James Munro King (16 April 1906 – March 1985) was a Scottish international footballer who spent the majority of his career with Hamilton Academical.

Career

Early years
King was born in Craigneuk, Wishaw on 16 April 1906. He could play equally well on either of the two extreme wing positions. He was introduced to Juvenile football with Carfin Harp by Robbie Donnelly, a former Partick Thistle player. While King was with them in 1928, they won every competition which the club participated except the Scottish Juvenile Cup. He also played for Carluke Rovers prior to his signature being obtained by Hamilton manager Willie McAndrew in 1929.

He was chosen to play for the Lanarkshire Junior League versus the Forfar District League.

Hamilton Academical
Originally a provisional signing for Hamilton Academical, he completed full signing forms on the 3 June 1929.

He was chosen to represent the Scottish Alliance League to meet a Scottish Junior Select at Firhill on 18 April 1931. Originally operating on the left, the advantage of his two-footedness was put to use to accommodate Bobby Reid who took over the number 11 jersey with King crossing over to the right side.

He played in the 1935 Scottish Cup Final for Hamilton against Rangers. Improved terms were offered to him, £4 per week, an increase of £1. By 1937, Bobby Reid was on the left wing and King had moved to the right; that was his role when a crowd of 28,690 turned up at Douglas Park on a Wednesday afternoon on 3 March to witness a Scottish Cup tie with Heart of Midlothian.

At 5'8" and 10sts 2 lb, he was an able marksman as well with over 80 goals in his 262 League appearances for Hamilton. He was a tremendous servant to the Accies and remained with them until 1939, when Jimmy McStay took him to Alloa Athletic to assist in their efforts to stay in the top League. With only five games played, war broke out (those appearances were declared unofficial) and at the age of 33, his career at the top level was at an end.

International
He earned a Scottish League XI place against the Irish League XI in 1933. This was overshadowed by his two full Scotland caps, both against Ireland, in 1932 and 1933; the result of the latter match was a home defeat, and King was one of five in the home team who were not selected for international duty again.

Personal life
One of his sons, Johnny, played for Hamilton during the 1960s at centre forward. Another, Eddie, was signed by Hibernian while an inside left with Wishaw Juniors, while Jimmy Jr turned out as junior with Douglasdale Juniors, Bellshill Athletic and Royal Albert.

King died in March 1985 at the age of 79, after a long illness. His son Jimmy was present at a 'Hall of Fame' Dinner in February 2002 when his father was named as one of the four best ever Hamilton Academical players. Appropriately, he was known to the Accies support as "King James".

References

External links 

1906 births
1985 deaths
Association football outside forwards
Hamilton Academical F.C. players
Alloa Athletic F.C. players
Scotland international footballers
Scottish footballers
Scottish Football League players
Carluke Rovers F.C. players
Scottish Football League representative players
Sportspeople from Wishaw
Scottish Junior Football Association players
Footballers from North Lanarkshire